WPXX-TV (channel 50) is a television station in Memphis, Tennessee, United States, affiliated with Ion Television. Owned by Inyo Broadcast Holdings, WPXX-TV maintains studios and transmitter facilities on Brother Boulevard in Bartlett, Tennessee. The station also serves as the de facto Ion outlet for the Jackson, Tennessee and Jonesboro, Arkansas markets.

History
The station first signed on the air on December 31, 1994, under the call letters WFBI; it was owned by Flinn Broadcasting, a company owned by Memphis businessman, radiologist (and later Shelby County commissioner) George Flinn. The station initially aired programming from the Home Shopping Network (sharing the affiliation with Holly Springs, Mississippi-based WBUY-TV channel 40, now a TBN owned-and-operated station), until Paxson Communications (now Ion Media) began operating the station under a local marketing agreement in 1998, when the station became a charter affiliate of the upstart Pax TV network (now Ion Television). During this time, the station also carried rebroadcasts of some WMC-TV newscasts. The station also carried a selected slate of Memphis Grizzlies games produced by Fox Sports Southeast from the team's inception until sometime in the late 2000s.

On February 22, 2006, News Corporation announced the launch of a new "sixth" network called MyNetworkTV, which would be operated by Fox Television Stations and its syndication division Twentieth Television. MyNetworkTV was created to compete against another upstart network that would launch at the same time that September, The CW (an amalgamated network that originally consisted primarily of UPN and The WB's higher-rated programs) as well as to give UPN and WB stations that were not mentioned as becoming CW affiliates another option besides converting to independent stations. Although WLMT (channel 30) had served as the market's UPN and WB affiliates, the MyNetworkTV affiliation instead went to WPXX, which officially joined the network (as a secondary affiliation) on September 5, 2006, branding itself as "My50 Memphis".

In mid-August 2007, Ion Media announced that it would purchase WPXX and sister station WPXL-TV in New Orleans outright from Flinn Broadcasting for $18 million. The sale was approved by the Federal Communications Commission and was completed on January 2, 2008.

On September 28, 2009, WPXX dropped MyNetworkTV programming as the network converted to a syndicated programming service. CW affiliate WLMT chose to pick up the MyNetworkTV affiliation, but only for the purposes of carrying WWE SmackDown (which it aired on Saturday evenings, rather than on its recommended Friday night timeslot), declining to run the remainder of the network's schedule. That lasted until SmackDown moved to the Syfy cable channel in October 2010, at which point WLMT's second digital subchannel picked up the full MyNetworkTV lineup while Retro Television Network programing (which would be dropped in November 2011 in favor of MeTV) outside of prime time.

Technical information

Subchannels
The station's digital signal is multiplexed:

Analog-to-digital conversion
WPXX-TV discontinued regular programming on its analog signal, over UHF channel 50, on June 12, 2009, as part of the federally mandated transition from analog to digital television. The station's digital signal remained on its pre-transition UHF channel 51, using PSIP to display WPXX-TV's virtual channel as 50 on digital television receivers.

References

External links
 

Ion Television affiliates
Court TV affiliates
Grit (TV network) affiliates
Defy TV affiliates
Scripps News affiliates
TrueReal affiliates
Television channels and stations established in 1994
1994 establishments in Tennessee
PXX-TV